Bardfield Saling is a village and former civil parish, now in the parish of The Salings, in the county of Essex, England. The village is in the district of Braintree and in the parliamentary constituency of Braintree. The parish is part of the Panfield, Shalford and The Salings parish cluster.

According to the 2001 census it had a population of 179, increasing to 193 at the 2011 Census.

There are 31 English Heritage listed buildings in the village, including the Grade I listed Church of St. Peter and St. Paul.

See also
 The Hundred Parishes

References

External links

Villages in Essex
Former civil parishes in Essex
Braintree District